Mahanati is a 2018 Indian Telugu-language biographical drama film written and directed by Nag Ashwin and produced by C. Ashwini Dutt, Swapna Dutt, and Priyanka Dutt under the banners Vyjayanthi Movies and Swapna Cinema. The film is based on the life of Indian actress Savitri, played by Keerthy Suresh while Dulquer Salmaan, in his Tollywood debut, plays the role of Gemini Ganesan. Samantha, Vijay Deverakonda, Shalini Pandey, Rajendra Prasad, Prakash Raj and Bhanupriya appear in supporting roles, while Naga Chaitanya and Mohan Babu, play guest appearances in the film. It follows Savitri's life, depicting her turbulent rise to prominence, marriage with Ganesan, and subsequent fall from grace, which is viewed from the perspective of a journalist and a photographer, played by Samantha and Deverakonda, respectively.

Made on a budget of 25 crore (250 million), Mahanati was released on 9 May 2018 and grossed over 850 million. The film was included in The Hindu's top 20 Tollywood films of the decade. The film garnered awards and nominations in several categories, with particular praise for its direction, screenplay, Keerthy's performance, music, cinematography, and editing.

At the 66th National Film Awards, Mahanati won three awards –  Best Feature Film in Telugu, Best Actress, Best Costume Design. The film was nominated in nine categories at 66th Filmfare Awards South in which it won in four categories. It was nominated in ten categories each at 8th South Indian International Movie Awards and 2nd Zee Cine Awards Telugu.

Accolades

Film charts 

 4th – IMDb
6th – iQlickMovies
7th – Karthik Keramalu, HuffPost
 10 Best Films of 2018 – Sangeetha Devi Dundoo, The Hindu
 Top 10 Telugu Movies 2018 – Sakshi Post
 25 Greatest Telugu Films Of The Decade – Sankeertana Varma, Film Companion

See also 

 List of Tollywood films of 2018
Mahanati (soundtrack)

Notes

References

External links 

 Accolades for Mahanati at the IMDb

Mahanati